Washington Street is a major east-west street in downtown Cape May, New Jersey.

It begins at Lafayette Street (New Jersey Route 109) and (officially) ends at Ocean Street. Unofficially, there is a walkway, named the Washington Street Mall, between Ocean Street and Perry Street. Washington Street Mall is filled with restaurants and stores, and, beside Cape May's beaches and Victorian houses, is one of the city's most noticeable features. Washington Street is parallel with Lafayette Street for all of its length.

History

The City of Cape May closed Washington Street to traffic from Ocean Street to Perry Street in 1970 to allow commercial development. Trees, flowers, and shrubs were planted, and the street was filled in. The Washington Street Mall was officially opened on June 24, 1971.

In December 1976, during the Christmas shopping season, the block between Jackson Street and Perry Street was consumed by a fire, but was rebuilt.

References

External links
 Washington Street Mall Official Site

Cape May, New Jersey
Streets in New Jersey
Transportation in Cape May County, New Jersey